The 1998 Nippon Professional Baseball season was the 49th season of operation for the league.

Regular season standings

Central League

Pacific League

Japan Series

See also
1998 Major League Baseball season

References

 
1998 in baseball
1998 in Japanese sport